In the mythology of Mangareva (French Polynesia), Tairi (Ta'iri) is the god of thunder.

References
R.D. Craig, Dictionary of Polynesian Mythology (Greenwood Press: New York, 1989), 253; 
A.C. Caillot, Mythes, légendes et traditions des Polynésiens (E. Laroux: Paris, 1914), 154.

Mangarevan mythology
Polynesian deities